Malcolm Tierney (25 February 1938 – 18 February 2014) was an English actor who appeared in many film and television roles.

Early life
Tierney's father, Ernest, was a boilermaker and trained draughtsman, from Warrington, who worked at Blackpool Pleasure Beach. His mother, Agnes, née Kennedy, worked in the cotton mills.

He attended St Mary's Roman Catholic School in Failsworth and studied design at the Manchester School of Art. While working as a textile designer and printmaker, he became involved in amateur dramatics at the Little Theatre, in Bolton, which had been set up by John Wardle, father of the drama critic Irving Wardle, whose wife, Norma, became a mentor to Tierney. As a result, he began a scholarship with the Rose Bruford Training College of Speech and Drama, in Sidcup, Kent, in 1958 and landed his first acting job in 1962.

Career
His roles included the part of Captain Monk Adderley in the original Poldark series, Tommy McArdle in Brookside between 1984 and 1987, Charlie Gimbert in Lovejoy (26 Episodes 1986 and 1993), Geoffrey Ellsworth-Smythe in A Bit of a Do, Patrick Woolton in House of Cards and Chief Const. Raymond in Dalziel and Pascoe. In science fiction, he appeared, uncredited, as the Imperial officer who questions the disguised Luke Skywalker and Han Solo on what they are doing with Chewbacca in Star Wars in 1977 and the Doctor Who serial The Trial of a Time Lord in 1986. He also appeared in Braveheart as the English sheriff who executes the wife of William Wallace, and is then subsequently himself killed by Wallace.

He appeared with the Royal Shakespeare Company in 1974–75 and 2005. In 1974 he played Claudio in Measure for Measure. In 2007 he played Dr Hugo Eckener in the docudrama Hindenburg: The Untold Story, which was about the crash of the airship Hindenburg and the investigation after it. This was aired for the 70th anniversary of the disaster.

In 2008 he played Captain Smith of the RMS Titanic in the docudrama Titanic: The Unsinkable Ship.

On radio he played Commander Brill-Oudener in the BBC Radio drama The Snow Goose by Paul Gallico, originally transmitted in May 2010.

Personal life

Tierney once shared a flat with Tom Baker who is best known for his portrayal of the Fourth Doctor in the BBC TV show Doctor Who. In 1979, Tierney married Andrea Schinko, an Austrian artist who survives him with their two daughters; Elsa, an artist and Anna, an actress.

Death

Malcolm Tierney died of pulmonary fibrosis, a week short of his 76th birthday. Vanessa Redgrave wrote in his obituary of a "loving man" and a "brilliant actor", he is buried in Highgate Cemetery, London.

Filmography

Film

Television

References

External links

Notice of death – BBC

1938 births
2014 deaths
People from Failsworth
English male film actors
English male television actors
English male Shakespearean actors
English male stage actors
Place of death missing
Deaths from pulmonary fibrosis
Burials at Highgate Cemetery